Freedom Song is a 1982 live album by Oscar Peterson, recorded in Japan.

Track listing
 "'Round Midnight" (Bernie Hanighen, Thelonious Monk, Cootie Williams) – 6:41
 Medley: "Watch What Happens"/"Waltz for Debby" (Norman Gimbel, Michel Legrand)/(Bill Evans, Gene Lees) – 8:43
 "Easy Living" (Ralph Rainger, Leo Robin) – 5:42
 "Move" (Denzil Best) – 4:03
 Medley: "Hymn to Freedom"/"The Fallen Warrior" (Oscar Peterson)/(Peterson) – 10:34
 "Sweet Lorraine" (Carter Burwell, Mitchell Parish) – 7:17
 "You Look Good to Me" (Seymour Lefco, Clement Wells) – 6:27
 "Now's the Time" (Charlie Parker) – 8:15
 "Future Child" (Niels-Henning Ørsted Pedersen) – 1:51
 "Mississauga Rattler" (Peterson) – 7:45
 "Nigerian Marketplace" (Peterson) – 7:12
 Medley: "Emily"/"Tenderly" (Johnny Mandel, Johnny Mercer)/(Walter Gross Jack Lawrence) – 11:28
 "Night Child" (Peterson) – 10:51
 "The Cakewalk" (Peterson) – 6:25

Personnel

Performance
 Martin Drew – drums
 Joe Pass – guitar
 Niels-Henning Ørsted Pedersen – double bass
 Oscar Peterson – piano

References

Oscar Peterson live albums
Albums produced by Norman Granz
1983 live albums
Pablo Records live albums